The 2012 Toyota Premier Cup featured Buriram United, the winners of the 2011 Thai League Cup against Vegalta Sendai, the fourth placed team from the 2011 J. League Division 1.

Final

2012
2012 in Thai football cups
2012 in Japanese football
2012